The following table is the list of urban areas by Azerbaijani population.

See also
 Azerbaijani population
 Azerbaijani diaspora

References

Demographics of Azerbaijan